Katsiaryna Kavaleva (born 17 February 1991) is a Belarusian boxer.

She won a medal at the 2019 AIBA Women's World Boxing Championships.

References

1991 births
Living people
AIBA Women's World Boxing Championships medalists
Belarusian women boxers
People from Mogilev
Heavyweight boxers
Sportspeople from Mogilev Region